Nicolas Jérôme Grégoire Meizonnet-Bérenguier (born 22 December 1983) is a French politician serving as the member of the National Assembly for the 2nd constituency of Gard since 1 February 2020. A member of the National Rally (RN), he has also been a departmental councillor of Gard for the canton of Vauvert since 2 April 2015.

Political career
The son of Jean-Louis Meizonnet, a municipal councillor of Vauvert and regional councillor of Occitanie, Nicolas Meizonnet is an engineer by occupation.

Meizonnet served as a municipal councillor of Vauvert from 8 December 2014 to 28 June 2020. He was elected to the Departmental Council of Gard in the 2015 election. Meizonnet became a member of the National Assembly after Gilbert Collard was elected to the European Parliament. As his substitute, Meizonnet took his place in the National Assembly.

References

External links
 Biography at the French Parliament

Living people
1983 births
People from Nîmes
People from Gard
Politicians from Occitania (administrative region)
Deputies of the 15th National Assembly of the French Fifth Republic
21st-century French politicians
National Rally (France) politicians
Deputies of the 16th National Assembly of the French Fifth Republic
Members of Parliament for Gard